Shanti Sandesham (English: Message of Peace) is a 2004 Indian Telugu-language film directed by P. Chandrasekhar Reddy. It was a biographical film about Jesus. The cast includes: Krishna, Suman, Vinod Kumar.

References

External links
 
 

2004 films
2000s Telugu-language films
Films about Jesus
Films based on the Bible
Films based on the New Testament
Films based on the Gospels
Films about Christianity
Films set in Palestine (region)
Films set in Jerusalem
Films set in ancient Egypt
Films set in the Roman Empire
Film portrayals of Jesus' death and resurrection
Films about the Nativity of Jesus
Depictions of Herod the Great on film
Portrayals of the Virgin Mary in film
Portrayals of Mary Magdalene in film
The Devil in film
Cultural depictions of Judas Iscariot
Cultural depictions of John the Baptist
Cultural depictions of the Biblical Magi
Cultural depictions of Paul the Apostle
Cultural depictions of Saint Peter
Cultural depictions of Pontius Pilate
Portrayals of Saint Joseph in film
Christian mass media in India